Paul O'Montis (3 April 1894 in Budapest as Paul Wendel – 17 July 1940 in Oranienburg, KZ Sachsenhausen) was a German singer, impersonator, and cabaret artist.

O'Montis grew up in Hannover. In 1924 he came to Berlin where he made first theater experiences on different cabaret stages. When he appeared in Friedrich Hollaender's revue Laterna Magica in 1926 he was noticed by the press for the first time. His first record was released by Odeon in 1927.

In 1939 he was arrested, quite possibly because of his homosexuality. In 1940 he died in the concentration camp Sachsenhausen. Officially he committed suicide but this is very controversial.

His grave is located at the municipal cemetery Altglienicke in the Berlin borough Treptow-Köpenick, in a collective grave.

References

External links

List of Publications

20th-century German male singers
Cabaret singers
1894 births
1940 deaths
German gay musicians
German LGBT singers
Gay singers
People who died in Sachsenhausen concentration camp
German people who died in Nazi concentration camps